is a private university in Yokkaichi, Mie, Japan, established in 2007.

External links
 Official website 

Educational institutions established in 2007
Private universities and colleges in Japan
Universities and colleges in Mie Prefecture
2007 establishments in Japan